The 2012–13 San Jose Sharks season was the club's 22nd season in the National Hockey League (NHL). The regular season was reduced from its usual 82 games to 48 due to the 2012–13 NHL lockout.

Standings

Regular season

January
The Sharks started the 2012–13 season with a perfect record; getting 14 out of 14 possible points in their seven January games. Patrick Marleau scored the Sharks first goal of the season, in the second period of the regular season opener against the Calgary Flames.

February
February would however be troublesome – in 12 games the Sharks would only get two wins and a total of eight points.

March
The Sharks were successful at home in March, with five wins and a loss in overtime. On the road, they had less success – registering three wins, five losses and an overtime loss. After eight seasons with the Sharks, Douglas Murray was traded to the Pittsburgh Penguins on March 25.

April
The Sharks were active around the trade deadline; Ryane Clowe, who also played with the Sharks for eight seasons, was traded to the New York Rangers, Michal Handzus was traded to the Chicago Blackhawks, Raffi Torres was acquired from the Phoenix Coyotes and Scott Hannan was acquired from the Nashville Predators. This is Hannan's second stint with San Jose.

On April 23, 2013, in the final home game of the regular season, the Sharks defeated the Stars 3–2 to clinch a playoff berth. The Sharks finished with a home record of 17–2–5 and qualified for the playoffs for the ninth consecutive season.

Schedule and results

Legend:

Playoffs

The San Jose Sharks enters the playoffs as the Western Conference's sixth seed. They swept the Vancouver Canucks in the first round, but were knocked out of the playoffs in a 4–3 series loss to the Los Angeles Kings in the second round.

Player statistics
Final stats
Skaters

Goaltenders

†Denotes player spent time with another team before joining the Sharks.  Stats reflect time with the Sharks only.
‡Traded mid-season
Bold/italics denotes franchise record

Transactions
The Sharks have been involved in the following transactions during the 2012–13 season.

Trades

Free agents signed

Free agents lost

Claimed via waivers

Lost via waivers

Lost via retirement

Players' signings

Draft picks
San Jose's picks at the 2012 NHL Entry Draft in Pittsburgh, Pennsylvania.

Draft notes
 The San Jose Sharks' second-round pick went to the Carolina Hurricanes as the result of a February 18, 2011, trade that sent Ian White to the Sharks in exchange for this pick.
 San Jose Sharks awarded 25th pick in second-round on August 16, 2011, as compensation for not signing 2007 first-round pick Patrick White.
 The San Jose Sharks' third-round pick went to the Florida Panthers as the result of a June 25, 2011, trade that sent a 2011 second-round pick to the Sharks in exchange for a 2011 second-round pick and this pick.
 The San Jose Sharks' fourth-round pick went to the Anaheim Ducks as the result of a March 4, 2009, trade that sent Travis Moen and Kent Huskins to the Sharks in exchange for Nick Bonino, Timo Pielmeier and this pick.
 The Chicago Blackhawks' fourth-round pick went to the San Jose Sharks as a result of a June 23, 2012, trade that sent a 2012 seventh-round pick and a 2013 fourth-round pick to the Blackhawks in exchange for this pick.

See also
 2012–13 NHL season

References

San Jose Sharks seasons
San Jose Sharks season, 2012-13
San Jose
San Jose Sharks
San Jose Sharks